Md. Ziaul Haque Mridha is a Jatiya Party politician and the former Member of Parliament from Brahmanbaria-2.

Early life
Mridha was born on 1 January 1952. He has a B.A. and a law degree.

Career
Mridha was elected to parliament in 2008 for the Brahmanbaria-2 constituency as a Jatiya Party candidate. In the 2014 Bangladeshi general election, Sheuly Azad, the Awami League nominee for Brahmanbaria-2, withdrew on instructions from party leader Sheikh Hasina, so as to support the party's coalition partner, the Jatiya Party. Mrida was re-elected on 5 January 2014.  He did not receive the nomination for the 2018 election and contested it as an independent candidate.

References

Jatiya Party politicians
Living people
1952 births
9th Jatiya Sangsad members
10th Jatiya Sangsad members